Mankavu is a suburb of Kozhikode, in Kerala, India.  It is known as the site of the Zamorin's kovilakam and it is called Mankavu Padinhare Kovilakam. Mankavu derives its name from the Zamorin's Mango Orchard that was in the area some historic records says that earlier was known as "Manavikraman kavu" and got shortened into "Mankave"   . The community is primarily residential, and is a common residential location for students from the local Zamorin's Guruvayurappan College. Krishna Varma and Ravi Varma, famous rebels of Calicut were born and brought up in Mankavu.

Mankavu Road, a major thoroughfare in Kozhikode is named after this area. Actual Mankavu is situated on the left of the bypass road towards Tirur.  It is predominantly inhabited by Muslims near the bypass road side and Hindus, which include few Brahmin families around the Thrissala Bhagavathy Kshethram, beyond the Kalpaka Theatre, a known spot in Mankavu.  On to the right of the bypass road junction, the road leads to Chalapuram, known for schools, residential colonies, Shiva Kshetram, Ganapathy Kshetram.

Kovilakam Residency, a business class hotel founded by the renowned public figure of Kozhikode Late Shri NB Krishnakurup is located here, at Govindapuram, north of Mankavu.

Thirssala Bhagavathy Kshethram, is the temple associated with the Zamorin's. The temple complex also have deities of Lord Krishna and Lord Shiva.

Index Number|PIN]]
| postal_code             = 673007

Major Organizations
 KOVILAKAM RESIDENCY (P) Ltd
 Malabar Institute of Medical Sciences
 Punjab National Bank Regional Headquarters
 Sharavana Bhavan Math
 Clean and Hygiene Center
 Kerala Land Reforms And Development Co operative Society

Major Temples
 Thrishala Bhagavathi Temple
 Valayanad Devi Temple
 Thalikunnu Mahashiva Temple
 Karthyayani Devi Temple

Kottooli and Pottammal
Govindapuram, Puthiyara and Mankavu are residential suburbs lying on the eastern side of Kozhikode city in India.  The road from Pushpa junction connects to Mankavu by the Mooriyad Road which is further extended to Konthanari Road.

The road from Meenchantha junction connects to Mankavu via the bypass road and it goes further north to Kovilakam Residency, Govindapuram and Puthiyara areas and finally terminating at the Arayidathu Palam junction near on the Mavoor Road.  
The road from Tali temple connects to Govindapuram via the Puthiyapalam Road and the K.P.Panicker Road.  Punjab National Bank has a headquarters facility here.  Valayanad Temple is situated at Govindapuram.  The central school grounds at Govindapuram are situated on a beautiful hillock from where the entire city of Kozhikode and even the Arabian sea are visible.

Govindapuram is connected on the north to Kuthiravattam Mental Hospital by the A.P.Balakrishnan Paillai Road.  This road is also connected to Kottooly and Pottammal junctions on the east of Kozhikode city.  Calicut Medical College is only five kilometers from here.

Pushpa junction is connected to Mankavu through Madhavan Nair Road.  Chalappuram Post Office is on this road and this route passes through Kalur Road Junction and Azhchavattom town before joining Mankavu junction.

After Mankavu town, the bypass passes Govindapuram road, MIMS Hospital and PNB Headquarters before joining the eastern side of Kozhikode city at Arayidathupalam.  The Baby Memorial Hospital and Comtrust Eye Hospital are located here.  The Sub Jail is another landmark in this place.

Gallery

Location

References

Suburbs of Kozhikode
Kozhikode downtown